Weber School District is a public school district located in Weber County, Utah, United States. The district covers all of Weber County, except the city of Ogden (which has its own district).

History
The district's origins reach as far back as 1849, when Charilla Abbott became the first school teacher at Brown's Fort. During the next half century, the school district grew from that one-room log cabin into what it is today. In June 1905 the independent schools in Weber County outside of Ogden City limits were combined into the Weber County School District. Weber High was the first high school in the district, winning the $300,000 building in 1926 by a vote of 733 to 480. Enrollment has increased substantially with student counts of 6,235 in 1949, 19,234 students in 1969, 25,859 students in 1989, and 30,069 students in 2007. In 2022, Gina Butters was named the superintendent of Weber School District. During 2017, a boundary reassessment was approved, making changes to Fremont High, Kanesville Elementary, West Haven Elementary, and Sand Ridge Jr. High effective at the beginning of the next school year in August 2017.

In February 2018 the Weber School District made news for its policy that required sixth grade girls to accept a boy's request for a dance, whether the girl wanted to dance with him or not.

Financial
Weber School District is listed as one of the top six Utah counties that spend the most on education, with a projected student enrollment increase of 29.6% from 2007 to 2022. It is the fifth largest school district in Utah, with a student to teacher ratio of 20 to 1, although some schools have classes at well over 35 students. As of the 2006 school year, Weber School District was spending $3,449 per student on institutional expenses with a total of $4,958 per student. As of August 2019, the district employs 1,699 teachers, 2,132 support staff, and 80 administrators.

Schools
Weber School District has four high schools, nine junior high schools, and 29 elementary schools. In addition, there are two alternative schools, a magnet school, and an online school.

Demographics are not available for the pilot school year
Magnet school
Alternative school

Technology
All schools have at least 2 computer labs, while all teachers can have access to computers in their classroom. Chromebooks and iPads are used to foster learning in many different classes. All students and teachers have their personal emails and are connected to the district's Active Directory database. Students' grades are accessible via the LANSA-built MyWeber. As of 2018, the district is moving forward with an initiative to pair students with an individual Chromebook; this program is called One-to-One.

See also

 List of school districts in Utah
 Ogden City School District

References

External links

 

School districts in Utah
Education in Weber County, Utah